Robert F. Casey (September 25, 1921 – October 7, 2006) was an American lawyer and politician.

Born in Borton, Illinois, Casey moved with his family to Chicago, Illinois and graduated from Hirsch High School. During World War II, Casey served in the United States Navy and was a pilot. Casey then received his bachelor's degree from University of Illinois at Urbana–Champaign and his law degree from University of Illinois College of Law. He practiced law in Aurora, Illinois and St. Charles, Illinois. From 1959 to 1962 and in 1979 to 1980, Casey served in the Illinois House of Representatives and was a Republican. Casey also served as chairman of the Illinois Motor Vehicle Review Board and as administrator of the Illinois Gaming Board. Casey died at his home in Batavia, Illinois.

Notes

1921 births
2006 deaths
Politicians from Chicago
People from Edgar County, Illinois
People from Aurora, Illinois
People from St. Charles, Illinois
University of Illinois Urbana-Champaign alumni
Illinois lawyers
Republican Party members of the Illinois House of Representatives
20th-century American politicians
People from Batavia, Illinois
Military personnel from Illinois
20th-century American lawyers
University of Illinois College of Law alumni
United States Navy personnel of World War II